Horse leg or Horseleg may refer to:

A leg of the horse, one of the limbs of the horse
Horseleg Lake, a lake in Minnesota
Horseleg Mountain, a mountain in Georgia, United States